Przemysław Rogowski (born 9 February 1980) is a Polish track and field athlete who specializes in the 100 metres.

International competitions

References

1980 births
Living people
Sportspeople from Kalisz
Polish male sprinters
European Athletics Championships medalists
21st-century Polish people